The 1997 African U-17 Championship qualification was a men's under-17 football competition which decided the participating teams of the 1997 African U-17 Championship.

Qualification

First round
The first leg match was played on 24 August 1996. The second leg match was played on 15 September 1996. The winner advanced to the Second Round.

|}

Second round
The matches were played between February and March 1997, but little information is available as all the results of the second leg matches are unknown. The winners advanced to the Finals.

|}

Qualified teams

 (host nation)

Notes and references

External links
 African U-17 Championship 1997 - rsssf.org

Under-17 Championship Qualification, 1997
1997